is a Japanese manga artist. He is best known for his dark fantasy manga series Tokyo Ghoul and Choujin X.

Career history
Sui Ishida is best known for his dark fantasy series Tokyo Ghoul, a story about a young man named Ken Kaneki who gets transformed into a ghoul after encountering one. The series then ran from 2011 to 2014 in Shueisha's Weekly Young Jump magazine, and was later adapted into a light novel and anime series in 2014. The manga was also translated into English where it topped The New York Times Best Seller list in 2015. A prequel titled Tokyo Ghoul [Jack] was briefly serialized digitally on Jump Live in 2013. In 2014, he began a sequel titled Tokyo Ghoul:re. In 2017, a live-action adaptation of Tokyo Ghoul was released theatrically in Japan. In March 2018, an anime adaptation for Tokyo Ghoul:re began to air with a second season released in October 2018.

In 2016, Ishida created a 69-page storyboard of a manga chapter based on Yoshihiro Togashi's Hunter × Hunter series. Depicting the past of the character Hisoka, the storyboard was released digitally via Shonen Jump+ on June 2, 2016.

on May 10, 2021, Ishida started the manga series Choujin X on Shueisha's Tonari no Young Jump website.

Works

Manga

Light novels

Video games

Awards and nominations

References

External links
 
 

1985 births
Japanese illustrators
Living people
Manga artists from Fukuoka Prefecture
Tokyo Ghoul
se on parhain homo